Lakes is a civil parish in the South Lakeland district of Cumbria, England. In the 2001 census the parish had a population of 5,127, decreasing at the 2011 census to 4,420. It covers the town of Ambleside, and the villages and hamlets of Clappersgate, Rydal, Grasmere, Troutbeck, Chapel Stile, Elterwater, Little Langdale and Waterhead.

Lakes CP incorporates within its boundaries the wards of Ambleside, the Langdales, Rydal & Loughrigg, Grasmere and Troutbeck.

The parish was formed in 1934 as an urban district, despite being largely rural, under a County Review Order, by a merger of Ambleside and Grasmere urban districts and parts of Windermere Urban District, South Westmorland Rural District and West Ward Rural District.

The A591 road, a primary route, passes through the centre of the CP, it enters the parish from the South at the point where it crosses Trout Beck at Troutbeck Bridge village. After covering 16 km (10 mi) in road distance,(13.4 km (8.5 mi) as the crow flies) it leaves the parish at Dunmail Raise. The A592 road passes through the eastern area of the parish. The col of the Kirkstone Pass, at a point approximately 200 m north of the Kirkstone Inn, marks the northern boundary of Lakes CP.

It is the area covered by the Kelsick Foundation, an organisation that helps locals with the costs of extra-curricular activities for children.

The urban district was abolished in 1974, with the Patterdale ward becoming a civil parish in the Eden district, and the rest becoming a civil parish in South Lakeland.

See also

Listed buildings in Lakes, Cumbria

References

Civil parishes in Cumbria
South Lakeland District